"How Long Gone" is a song written by Shawn Camp and John Scott Sherrill and recorded by American country music duo Brooks & Dunn. It was released in June 1998 as the second single from their 1998 album If You See Her. The song reached number one on the US Billboard Hot Country Singles & Tracks (now Hot Country Songs) chart in September 1998.

Music video
The music video was directed by Steven Goldmann. The video starts out with a woman running out of the house, then with the duo playing while spinning around the house with everything rotting, and clocks with their hands turning quickly. At the end, the duo fades away into dust particles, and the house appears to have rotted out, and the pages on the calendar that was flipping throughout the video are all gone.

Cover versions
Country music singer Jason Aldean covered the song from The Last Rodeo Tour

Chart positions
"How Long Gone" debuted at number 70 on the U.S. Billboard Hot Country Singles & Tracks for the week of June 29, 1998.

Year-end charts

References

1998 singles
1998 songs
Brooks & Dunn songs
Songs written by Shawn Camp (musician)
Songs written by John Scott Sherrill
Song recordings produced by Don Cook
Music videos directed by Steven Goldmann
Arista Nashville singles